Symmoca nigromaculella is a moth of the family Autostichidae. It is found in Portugal and Spain.

References

Moths described in 1875
Symmoca